The 2001–02 Edmonton Oilers season was the Oilers' 23rd season in the National Hockey League, and they were coming off a 39–28–12–3 record in 2000–01, earning 93 points, the highest point total the Oilers had achieved since the 1987–88 season, when they earned 99 points. The Oilers would meet the Dallas Stars in the opening round of the playoffs, and lose in six games.

During the off-season, Edmonton traded Doug Weight to the St. Louis Blues, along with Michel Riesen for Marty Reasoner, Jochen Hecht and Jan Horacek. With the trading of the captain, the Oilers named defenceman Jason Smith the new captain of the club.

Despite the loss of Weight, the Oilers got off to a great start, and on December 16, they sat at the top of the Northwest Division with 43 points.  Edmonton would then slump, going 9–16–7–1 in their next 33 games to drop them out of the playoff picture.  The club would then go on a 9-game unbeaten streak, and despite finishing the year with a 38–28–12–4 record, good for 90 points, they would miss the playoffs for the first time since 1996, finishing two points behind the eighth place Vancouver Canucks.

Offensively, Edmonton-born Mike Comrie led the club with 33 goals and 60 points, while Anson Carter scored 28 goals and also earn 60 points. Ryan Smyth earned 50 points in only 61 games.  Janne Niinimaa led the club with 39 assists, and led the defense with 44 points.  Georges Laraque provided the club toughness, earning 157 penalty minutes.

In goal, Tommy Salo would have arguably the best season ever by an Oilers goaltender, winning 30 games, posting a club record 2.22 goals against average (GAA) and earning five shutouts. The 182 goals the Oilers allowed was a club record for fewest in a season and the second lowest total in the NHL during the season.

Season standings

Schedule and results

|-  style="text-align:center; background:#fbb;"
| 1 || October 3 || Edmonton Oilers || 0 – 1 || Calgary Flames || || Salo || 16,242 || 0–1–0–0 || 0 || 
|-  style="text-align:center; background:#cfc;"
| 2 || October 6 || Phoenix Coyotes || 2 – 6 || Edmonton Oilers || || Salo || 16,839 || 1–1–0–0 || 2 || 
|-  style="text-align:center; background:#cfc;"
| 3 || October 9 || Chicago Blackhawks || 0 – 1 || Edmonton Oilers || || Salo || 14,191 || 2–1–0–0 || 4 || 
|-  style="text-align:center; background:#cfc;"
| 4 || October 11 || Colorado Avalanche || 3 – 5 || Edmonton Oilers || || Salo || 15,843 || 3–1–0–0 || 6 || 
|-  style="text-align:center; background:#cfc;"
| 5 || October 13 || Edmonton Oilers || 4 – 3 || Nashville Predators || || Salo || 13,117 || 4–1–0–0 || 8 || 
|-  style="text-align:center; background:white;"
| 6 || October 14 || Edmonton Oilers || 3 – 3 || Minnesota Wild || OT || Salo || 18,064 || 4–1–1–0 || 9 || 
|-  style="text-align:center; background:#fbb;"
| 7 || October 16 || Toronto Maple Leafs || 4 – 1 || Edmonton Oilers || || Salo || 16,839 || 4–2–1–0 || 9 || 
|-  style="text-align:center; background:#cfc;"
| 8 || October 18 || Edmonton Oilers || 4 – 1 || Colorado Avalanche || || Salo || 18,007 || 5–2–1–0 || 11 || 
|-  style="text-align:center; background:#cfc;"
| 9 || October 20 || Florida Panthers || 2 – 6 || Edmonton Oilers || || Conklin || 16,839 || 6–2–1–0 || 13 || 
|-  style="text-align:center; background:#fbb;"
| 10 || October 22 || Nashville Predators || 4 – 2 || Edmonton Oilers || || Salo || 15,281 || 6–3–1–0 || 13 || 
|-  style="text-align:center; background:#fbb;"
| 11 || October 24 || Edmonton Oilers || 1 – 4 || Detroit Red Wings || || Salo || 20,058 || 6–4–1–0 || 13 || 
|-  style="text-align:center; background:#cfc;"
| 12 || October 25 || Edmonton Oilers || 5 – 2 || Columbus Blue Jackets || || Conklin || 18,136 || 7–4–1–0 || 15 || 
|-  style="text-align:center; background:#cfc;"
| 13 || October 27 || Vancouver Canucks || 2 – 3 || Edmonton Oilers || || Salo || 16,839 || 8–4–1–0 || 17 || 
|-  style="text-align:center; background:#cfc;"
| 14 || October 30 || Montreal Canadiens || 1 – 3 || Edmonton Oilers || || Salo || 16,367 || 9–4–1–0 || 19 || 
|-

|-  style="text-align:center; background:#fbb;"
| 15 || November 2 || Columbus Blue Jackets || 2 – 1 || Edmonton Oilers || || Salo || 15,944 || 9–5–1–0 || 19 || 
|-  style="text-align:center; background:#cfc;"
| 16 || November 4 || Edmonton Oilers || 2 – 0 || Minnesota Wild || || Salo || 18,064 || 10–5–1–0 || 21 || 
|-  style="text-align:center; background:#ffb;"
| 17 || November 6 || Edmonton Oilers || 0 – 1 || Boston Bruins || OT || Salo || 12,134 || 10–5–1–1 || 22 || 
|-  style="text-align:center; background:#cfc;"
| 18 || November 9 || Edmonton Oilers || 3 – 0 || Columbus Blue Jackets || || Salo || 18,136 || 11–5–1–1 || 24 || 
|-  style="text-align:center; background:white;"
| 19 || November 11 || Edmonton Oilers || 1 – 1 || Carolina Hurricanes || OT || Salo || 12,390 || 11–5–2–1 || 25 || 
|-  style="text-align:center; background:#cfc;"
| 20 || November 13 || Edmonton Oilers || 5 – 4 || Phoenix Coyotes || OT || Salo || 10,512 || 12–5–2–1 || 27 || 
|-  style="text-align:center; background:#cfc;"
| 21 || November 16 || Chicago Blackhawks || 1 – 7 || Edmonton Oilers || || Salo || 16,839 || 13–5–2–1 || 29 || 
|-  style="text-align:center; background:white;"
| 22 || November 17 || Edmonton Oilers || 2 – 2 || Vancouver Canucks || OT || Salo || 18,422 || 13–5–3–1 || 30 || 
|-  style="text-align:center; background:#cfc;"
| 23 || November 20 || St. Louis Blues || 0 – 2 || Edmonton Oilers || || Salo || 16,839 || 14–5–3–1 || 32 || 
|-  style="text-align:center; background:#fbb;"
| 24 || November 22 || Los Angeles Kings || 4 – 2 || Edmonton Oilers || || Salo || 16,434 || 14–6–3–1 || 32 || 
|-  style="text-align:center; background:#fbb;"
| 25 || November 24 || Edmonton Oilers || 0 – 2 || Colorado Avalanche || || Salo || 18,007 || 14–7–3–1 || 32 || 
|-  style="text-align:center; background:#cfc;"
| 26 || November 28 || Edmonton Oilers || 2 – 0 || Mighty Ducks of Anaheim || || Markkanen || 9,527 || 15–7–3–1 || 34 || 
|-  style="text-align:center; background:#cfc;"
| 27 || November 29 || Edmonton Oilers || 3 – 1 || Los Angeles Kings || || Salo || 15,643 || 16–7–3–1 || 36 || 
|-

|-  style="text-align:center; background:#fbb;"
| 28 || December 1 || Dallas Stars || 6 – 4 || Edmonton Oilers || || Salo || 16,839 || 16–8–3–1 || 36 || 
|-  style="text-align:center; background:#cfc;"
| 29 || December 5 || Mighty Ducks of Anaheim || 2 – 3 || Edmonton Oilers || OT || Salo || 15,545 || 17–8–3–1 || 38 || 
|-  style="text-align:center; background:#fbb;"
| 30 || December 7 || Edmonton Oilers || 0 – 5 || Dallas Stars || || Salo || 18,532 || 17–9–3–1 || 38 || 
|-  style="text-align:center; background:white;"
| 31 || December 8 || Edmonton Oilers || 2 – 2 || Nashville Predators || OT || Salo || 14,158 || 17–9–4–1 || 39 || 
|-  style="text-align:center; background:#ffb;"
| 32 || December 11 || Edmonton Oilers || 4 – 5 || San Jose Sharks || OT || Salo || 17,496 || 17–9–4–2 || 40 || 
|-  style="text-align:center; background:#fbb;"
| 33 || December 13 || Detroit Red Wings || 2 – 1 || Edmonton Oilers || || Salo ||| 16,839 || 17–10–4–2 || 40 || 
|-  style="text-align:center; background:#cfc;"
| 34 || December 14 || Tampa Bay Lightning || 1 – 2 || Edmonton Oilers || || Markkanen || 16,272 || 18–10–4–2 || 42 || 
|-  style="text-align:center; background:#cfc;"
| 35 || December 16 || Edmonton Oilers || 3 – 2 || Philadelphia Flyers || || Salo || 19,343 || 19–10–4–2 || 44 || 
|-  style="text-align:center; background:#fbb;"
| 36 || December 18 || Edmonton Oilers || 1 – 4 || New York Islanders || || Salo || 10,551 || 19–11–4–2 || 44 || 
|-  style="text-align:center; background:white;"
| 37 || December 20 || Edmonton Oilers || 3 – 3 || New Jersey Devils || OT || Salo || 14,150 || 19–11–5–2 || 45 || 
|-  style="text-align:center; background:#fbb;"
| 38 || December 21 || Edmonton Oilers || 1 – 5 || Chicago Blackhawks || || Salo || 14,326 || 19–12–5–2 || 45 || 
|-  style="text-align:center; background:#cfc;"
| 39 || December 26 || Calgary Flames || 2 – 3 || Edmonton Oilers || || Salo || 16,839 || 20–12–5–2 || 47 || 
|-  style="text-align:center; background:#cfc;"
| 40 || December 28 || Minnesota Wild || 2 – 3 || Edmonton Oilers || || Markkanen || 16,839 || 21–12–5–2 || 49 || 
|-  style="text-align:center; background:#fbb;"
| 41 || December 30 || New Jersey Devils || 2 – 1 || Edmonton Oilers || || Salo || 16,839 || 21–13–5–2 || 49 || 
|-  style="text-align:center; background:white;"
| 42 || December 31 || Edmonton Oilers || 2 – 2 || Calgary Flames || OT || Salo || 17,409 || 21–13–6–2 || 50 || 
|-

|-  style="text-align:center; background:#cfc;"
| 43 || January 2 || New York Rangers || 1 – 4 || Edmonton Oilers || || Salo || 16,839 || 22–13–6–2 || 52 || 
|-  style="text-align:center; background:#fbb;"
| 44 || January 5 || Vancouver Canucks || 4 – 3 || Edmonton Oilers || || Salo || 16,839 || 22–14–6–2 || 52 || 
|-  style="text-align:center; background:#cfc;"
| 45 || January 6 || Montreal Canadiens || 6 – 7 || Edmonton Oilers || || Salo || 16,839 || 23–14–6–2 || 54 || 
|-  style="text-align:center; background:#fbb;"
| 46 || January 10 || Carolina Hurricanes || 4 – 1 || Edmonton Oilers || || Salo || 16,322 || 23–15–6–2 || 54 || 
|-  style="text-align:center; background:white;"
| 47 || January 12 || Colorado Avalanche || 2 – 2 || Edmonton Oilers || OT || Salo || 16,839 || 23–15–7–2 || 55 || 
|-  style="text-align:center; background:#fbb;"
| 48 || January 14 || Edmonton Oilers || 1 – 2 || Chicago Blackhawks || || Salo || 12,887 || 23–16–7–2 || 55 || 
|-  style="text-align:center; background:#fbb;"
| 49 || January 15 || Edmonton Oilers || 2 – 3 || St. Louis Blues || || Markkanen || 19,729 || 23–17–7–2 || 55 || 
|-  style="text-align:center; background:#cfc;"
| 50 || January 18 || Mighty Ducks of Anaheim || 1 – 3 || Edmonton Oilers || || Salo || 16,558 || 24–17–7–2 || 57 || 
|-  style="text-align:center; background:#fbb;"
| 51 || January 19 || Pittsburgh Penguins || 1 – 0 || Edmonton Oilers || || Salo || 16,839 || 24–18–7–2 || 57 || 
|-  style="text-align:center; background:#fbb;"
| 52 || January 21 || Edmonton Oilers || 3 – 4 || San Jose Sharks || || Salo || 17,496 || 24–19–7–2 || 57 || 
|-  style="text-align:center; background:#fbb;"
| 53 || January 23 || Colorado Avalanche || 4 – 2 || Edmonton Oilers || || Salo || 16,634 || 24–20–7–2 || 57 || 
|-  style="text-align:center; background:#cfc;"
| 54 || January 26 || Toronto Maple Leafs || 1 – 4 || Edmonton Oilers || || Salo || 16,839 || 25–20–7–2 || 59 || 
|-  style="text-align:center; background:white;"
| 55 || January 28 || Detroit Red Wings || 1 – 1 || Edmonton Oilers || OT || Salo || 16,839 || 25–20–8–2 || 60 || 
|-  style="text-align:center; background:white;"
| 56 || January 30 || Edmonton Oilers || 2 – 2 || Vancouver Canucks || OT || Salo || 18,422 || 25–20–9–2 || 61 || 
|-

|-  style="text-align:center; background:#fbb;"
| 57 || February 5 || Edmonton Oilers || 2 – 3 || Atlanta Thrashers || || Markkanen || 10,875 || 25–21–9–2 || 61 || 
|-  style="text-align:center; background:#fbb;"
| 58 || February 7 || Edmonton Oilers || 1 – 3 || St. Louis Blues || || Salo || 18,632 || 25–22–9–2 || 61 || 
|-  style="text-align:center; background:white;"
| 59 || February 8 || Edmonton Oilers || 1 – 1 || Dallas Stars || OT || Markkanen || 18,532 || 25–22–10–2 || 62 || 
|-  style="text-align:center; background:#cfc;"
| 60 || February 10 || Edmonton Oilers || 4 – 3 || Phoenix Coyotes || || Salo || 12,147 || 26–22–10–2 || 64 || 
|-  style="text-align:center; background:#fbb;"
| 61 || February 12 || San Jose Sharks || 3 – 2 || Edmonton Oilers || || Salo || 16,839 || 26–23–10–2 || 64 || 
|-  style="text-align:center; background:#fbb;"
| 62 || February 28 || Nashville Predators || 3 – 2 || Edmonton Oilers || || Salo || 16,585 || 26–24–10–2 || 64 || 
|-

|-  style="text-align:center; background:white;"
| 63 || March 2 || St. Louis Blues || 1 – 1 || Edmonton Oilers || OT || Markkanen || 16,839 || 26–24–11–2 || 65 || 
|-  style="text-align:center; background:#cfc;"
| 64 || March 4 || Edmonton Oilers || 3 – 0 || Buffalo Sabres || || Markkanen || 16,661 || 27–24–11–2 || 67 || 
|-  style="text-align:center; background:#cfc;"
| 65 || March 6 || Edmonton Oilers || 3 – 2 || Tampa Bay Lightning || || Salo || 13,256 || 28–24–11–2 || 69 || 
|-  style="text-align:center; background:#fbb;"
| 66 || March 8 || Edmonton Oilers || 4 – 5 || Florida Panthers || || Markkanen || 15,914 || 28–25–11–2 || 69 || 
|-  style="text-align:center; background:#fbb;"
| 67 || March 10 || Edmonton Oilers || 2 – 4 || Washington Capitals || || Salo || 18,672 || 28–26–11–2 || 69 || 
|-  style="text-align:center; background:#ffb;"
| 68 || March 13 || Edmonton Oilers || 3 – 4 || Detroit Red Wings || OT || Markkanen || 20,058 || 28–26–11–3 || 70 || 
|-  style="text-align:center; background:#cfc;"
| 69 || March 14 || Edmonton Oilers || 4 – 1 || Ottawa Senators || || Salo || 18,397 || 29–26–11–3 || 72 || 
|-  style="text-align:center; background:#cfc;"
| 70 || March 16 || Washington Capitals || 1 – 4 || Edmonton Oilers || || Salo || 16,839 || 30–26–11–3 || 74 || 
|-  style="text-align:center; background:#cfc;"
| 71 || March 20 || San Jose Sharks || 1 – 2 || Edmonton Oilers || || Salo || 16,839 || 31–26–11–3 || 76 || 
|-  style="text-align:center; background:#cfc;"
| 72 || March 23 || Calgary Flames || 1 – 3 || Edmonton Oilers || || Salo || 16,839 || 32–26–11–3 || 78 || 
|-  style="text-align:center; background:#cfc;"
| 73 || March 24 || Edmonton Oilers || 2 – 0 || Vancouver Canucks || || Salo || 18,422 || 33–26–11–3 || 80 || 
|-  style="text-align:center; background:#cfc;"
| 74 || March 26 || Columbus Blue Jackets || 1 – 3 || Edmonton Oilers || || Markkanen || 16,639 || 34–26–11–3 || 82 || 
|-  style="text-align:center; background:white;"
| 75 || March 28 || Los Angeles Kings || 2 – 2 || Edmonton Oilers || OT || Salo || 16,839 || 34–26–12–3 || 83 || 
|-  style="text-align:center; background:#cfc;"
| 76 || March 30 || Dallas Stars || 1 – 3 || Edmonton Oilers || || Salo || 16,839 || 35–26–12–3 || 85 || 
|-

|-  style="text-align:center; background:#cfc;"
| 77 || April 2 || Minnesota Wild || 1 – 2 || Edmonton Oilers || OT || Salo || 16,839 || 36–26–12–3 || 87 || 
|-  style="text-align:center; background:#fbb;"
| 78 || April 5 || Edmonton Oilers || 0 – 2 || Mighty Ducks of Anaheim || || Salo || 13,369 || 36–27–12–3 || 87 || 
|-  style="text-align:center; background:#ffb;"
| 79 || April 6 || Edmonton Oilers || 3 – 4 || Los Angeles Kings || OT || Salo || 18,311 || 36–27–12–4 || 88 || 
|-  style="text-align:center; background:#cfc;"
| 80 || April 10 || Phoenix Coyotes || 0 – 3 || Edmonton Oilers || || Salo || 16,839 || 37–27–12–4 || 90 || 
|-  style="text-align:center; background:#fbb;"
| 81 || April 12 || Calgary Flames || 2 – 0 || Edmonton Oilers || || Salo || 16,839 || 37–28–12–4 || 90 || 
|-  style="text-align:center; background:#cfc;"
| 82 || April 14 || Edmonton Oilers || 4 – 2 || Minnesota Wild || || Markkanen || 18,568 || 38–28–12–4 || 92 || 
|-

|-
| Legend:

Player statistics

Scoring
 Position abbreviations: C = Centre; D = Defence; G = Goaltender; LW = Left Wing; RW = Right Wing
  = Joined team via a transaction (e.g., trade, waivers, signing) during the season. Stats reflect time with the Oilers only.
  = Left team via a transaction (e.g., trade, waivers, release) during the season. Stats reflect time with the Oilers only.

Goaltending

Awards and records

Awards

Records
 15: A new Oilers record for most shutouts in a career by Tommy Salo on March 24, 2002.

Milestones

Transactions
The Oilers were involved in the following transactions from June 10, 2001, the day after the deciding game of the 2001 Stanley Cup Finals, through June 13, 2002, the day of the deciding game of the 2002 Stanley Cup Finals.

Trades

Players acquired

Players lost

Signings

Draft picks
Edmonton's draft picks at the 2001 NHL Entry Draft.

Notes

References

 National Hockey League Guide & Record Book 2007

Edmonton Oilers season, 2001-02
Edmon
Edmonton Oilers seasons